Cinco besos (English: Five kisses) is a 1946 Argentine comedy film, directed by Luis Saslavsky and written by the own Saslavsky and Ariel Cortazzo. It premiered on March 8, 1946.

Cast
 Mirtha Legrand
 Roberto Escalada
 Elena Lucena
 Lalo Maura
 Benita Puértolas
 Ana Nieves
 Warly Ceriani
 Iris Martorell
 Aída Villadeamigo
 Margarita Burke

References

1946 films
1940s Spanish-language films
Argentine black-and-white films
Argentine comedy films
1946 comedy films
1940s Argentine films